The Saint Andrew the First-Called Georgian University of the Patriarchate of Georgia is a university founded in 2008 in Tbilisi, Georgia.

References 

Universities in Georgia (country)
Education in Tbilisi
Educational institutions established in 2008
2008 establishments in Georgia (country)
Vake, Tbilisi